Out of the Inner Circle: A Hacker's Guide to Computer Security is a book by Bill Landreth and Howard Rheingold, published in 1985 by Microsoft Press and distributed by Simon & Schuster. The book was created to provide insight into the ways and methods of the hacking community in days before internet became prevalent. Although largely outdated and nostalgic, it does show what brought on many of the current trends we see in network security today.

References

1985 non-fiction books
Computer security books
Microsoft Press books
Works about computer hacking